Monmouthshire is a county and principal area of Wales. It borders Torfaen and Newport to the west; Herefordshire and Gloucestershire to the east; and Powys to the north. The largest town is Abergavenny, with the other major towns being Chepstow, Monmouth, and Usk. The present county was formed under the Local Government (Wales) Act 1994, and comprises some sixty percent of the historic county. Between 1974 and 1996, the county was known by the ancient title of Gwent, recalling the medieval Welsh kingdom. In his essay on local government in the fifth and final volume of the Gwent County History, Robert McCloy suggests that the governance of "no county in the United Kingdom in the twentieth century was so transformed as that of Monmouthshire".
 
In the United Kingdom the term "listed building" refers to a building or structure officially designated as of special architectural, historical or cultural significance. Listing was begun by a provision in the Town and Country Planning Act 1947. Once a building is listed, strict limitations are imposed on allowable modifications to its structure or fittings. In Wales, the authority for listing under the Planning (Listed Buildings and Conservation Areas) Act 1990 rests with Cadw.
Listed buildings are categorised into three grades:
 Grade I – buildings of exceptional interest, only 2.5% of listed buildings in England and Wales are Grade I;
 Grade II* – buildings of particular importance with more than special interest, 5.8% of listed buildings in England and Wales are Grade II*;
 Grade II – buildings of special interest; 91.7% of all listed buildings in England and Wales are in this class.

There are 244 Grade II* listed buildings in Monmouthshire. They include seventy-two houses, forty-two churches, thirty-five farmhouses, twenty-one commercial premises, eight bridges, seven barns, six garden structures, four sets of walls, railings or gates, three gatehouses, two chapels, two community centres, two dovecotes, an almshouse, an aqueduct, a castle, a courthouse, a cross, a dairy, a folly, a masonic lodge, a mill, a prison, a former slaughterhouse, a statue and a theatre.

The architecture of the county was first systematically covered by William Coxe in his two-volume journal, An Historical Tour in Monmouthshire, published in 1801. A detailed county history was undertaken by Sir Joseph Bradney, in his A History of Monmouthshire from the Coming of the Normans into Wales down to the Present Time, published in the early 20th century. More recent studies include those of the architectural historian John Newman, in his Gwent/Monmouthshire volume of the Pevsner Buildings of Wales series published in 2000; the coverage of Monmouthshire houses in Peter Smith's Houses of the Welsh Countryside, published in 1975 and, most exhaustively, by Sir Cyril Fox and Lord Raglan, in their three-volume study, Monmouthshire Houses, published between 1951 and 1954. The last was described by Smith as "one of the most remarkable studies of vernacular architecture yet made in the British Isles" and "a landmark, in its own field, as significant as Darwin's Origin of Species".

Noteworthy buildings and people
Monmouthshire's only Grade II* listed castle, Skenfrith, forms the eastern point of the Three Castles triangle, a grouping that remained in unified ownership from the reign of King Stephen until the 20th century. William Coxe, in his 1801 history, described it as "the oldest castle in Monmouthshire". Architects of national importance who worked in the county include John Nash and Sir John Soane, who made their respective marks at the Clytha Park gates and the, now ruinous, Piercefield House. Sir Aston Webb, who designed the present frontage of Buckingham Palace, built on a less imposing scale at the Swiss Cottage, Rockfield. The involvement of such national figures was rare; the county's major houses are predominantly modest dwellings built by the Welsh gentry, such as Lower Dyffryn House, Grosmont, constructed by a cadet branch of the Cecil family. Llanarth Court, constructed for John Jones, a member of the Monmouthshire squirearchy, and described by John Newman as a "neo-classical monster", is unusual both in its scale and its style. Nos. 1–6 Priory Street in Monmouth, which begin what Newman called "a remarkably early inner bypass", are by George Vaughan Maddox, whose work contributed much to the architectural flavour of the county town. The county's churches are predominantly medieval, such as the Church of St Cybi at Llangybi. Exceptions include the Church of St Mary and St Michael, Llanarth, the first Catholic chapel built in Monmouthshire since the Dissolution of the Monasteries, and St Mary's Priory Church, Monmouth, by the Victorian architect, George Edmund Street.

Notable people connected with Monmouthshire's Grade II* listed buildings include the Catholic martyr David Lewis who was imprisoned at 30 Bridge Street, Usk prior to his execution in 1679; Lord Nelson, whose tour down what he called that "little gut of a river, the Wye", is commemorated in a pavilion in the Nelson Garden in Monmouth; the aviation and motoring pioneer, Charles Stewart Rolls, the first Briton to die in a plane crash, who lived at The Hendre, Monmouthshire's major Victorian country house, and whose statue stands in Agincourt Square; and Winston Churchill, whose predecessors lived at Trewyn House in the north of the county. For over two hundred years, the Dukes of Beaufort directed the management of their extensive Monmouthshire estates, and the political life of the county, from their seat at Troy House. FitzRoy Somerset, 1st Baron Raglan, received Cefntilla Court in recognition of his services as the British commander during the Crimean War; and the writer and gardener, Henry Avray Tipping built two houses for himself, at Mounton and at High Glanau. John Loraine Baldwin, a founder of the cricket club I Zingari and author of the rules of both badminton and whist, lived at St Anne's House, Tintern. The Victorian poet Cecil Frances Alexander was reputed to have been inspired to write the hymn All Things Bright and Beautiful by the countryside around Llanwenarth House.

Buildings

External links
Click here to see an interactive OpenStreetMap with locations of all Grade II* listed buildings, Monmouthshire-wide, for which coordinates are included in the list-articles linked above.

See also

 Listed buildings in Wales
 Grade I listed buildings in Monmouthshire
 List of Scheduled Monuments in Monmouthshire
 Registered historic parks and gardens in Monmouthshire
Grade II* listed buildings in Blaenau Gwent
Grade II* listed buildings in Forest of Dean
Grade II* listed buildings in Herefordshire
Grade II* listed buildings in Newport
Grade II* listed buildings in Powys
Grade II* listed buildings in Torfaen

Footnotes

References

Sources

 

 
 
 

 

 
 
 
 
 
 
 
 
 

 
Monmouthshire II*